Pseudolepicoleaceae is a family of liverworts in the order Jungermanniales.

Taxonomy
 Archeophylla Schuster 1963
 Castanoclobos Engel & Glenny 2007
 Chaetocolea Spruce 1885
 Herzogiaria Fulford ex Hässel de Menendez 1981
 Isophyllaria Hodgson & Allison 1965 [Fulfordiella Hässel de Menendez 1974]
 Pseudolepicolea Fulford & Taylor 1960 [Archeochaete Schuster 1963; Lophochaete Schuster 1961] 
 Temnoma Mitten 1867

References

External links

Jungermanniales
Liverwort families